Licensed to Kill is a 1997 documentary written, directed, and produced by Arthur Dong, in which Dong, a gay man himself, interviews various murderers known for their homophobic murders.

Murderers featured
Raymond Childs, murderer of a 55-year-old gay man who made sexual advances toward him. Currently serving 25 years to life in Sing Sing Prison.
Donald Aldrich, murderer of Nicholas West, whom he met at a gay hangout, and with the help of two accomplices, shot nine times. Executed via lethal injection on October 12, 2004, in Huntsville, Texas.
Corey Burley, murderer of Thanh Nguyen, a Vietnamese immigrant whom he shot once and killed after stalking him and his partner in a park. Currently serving a life sentence at the Hodge Facility in Rusk, Texas.
William Cross, murderer of William Lemke, who made sexual advances toward him. He was sentenced to 25 years in the Dixon State Correctional Center of Illinois. On July 13, 2006, he was released on parole.
Kenneth Jr. French, murderer of Wesley Cover, James Kidd, Ethel Parrous, and Pete Parrous, who were customers at a Luigi's restaurant in Fayetteville, North Carolina, after getting highly intoxicated. Unlike the other murderers featured in the film, none of French's victims were known to be homosexual, but rather, his act was out of anger toward the then President Bill Clinton for lifting the ban on homosexuals in the United States Military. He is currently serving four consecutive life sentences, plus 35 years, at the Polk Youth Institution in Butner, North Carolina.
Jay Johnson, murderer of former State Senator John Chenoweth and Joel Larson at gay hangouts in Minneapolis. Unlike the other murderers in the film, he recognized he was in fact gay himself both before and after his committed murders. He is currently serving two concurrent life terms at the St. Cloud Correctional Facility, as an openly gay man.
Jeffrey Swinford, murderer of Chris Miller, whom he and two friends met at a local gay hangout, went over to his house for alcohol and drugs, and then subsequently beat Miller to death and robbed him. Currently serving a 20-year sentence and is up for parole in 2009.

Awards
Best Documentary Director Award at the Sundance Film Festival, 1997.
Filmmakers Trophy Award at the Sundance Film Festival, 1997.
Official Selection at the Berlin International Film Festival, 1997.
National Emmy Nomination for Best Director, News & Documentary.

References

External links
Official Website
Licensed to Kill at the Internet Movie Database

1997 films
1997 LGBT-related films
American documentary films
Documentary films about gay men
Documentary films about violence against LGBT people
Films directed by Arthur Dong
POV (TV series) films
Documentary films about crime in the United States
Asian-American LGBT-related films
Violence against gay men in the United States
1997 documentary films
Sundance Film Festival award winners
1990s English-language films
1990s American films